The Sri Lanka national cricket team toured the West Indies in June 2003 to play two Test matches and three One Day Internationals. Sri Lanka won the ODI series 2–1, but the West Indies won the Test series 1–0 after one Test was drawn.

Squads

Tour matches

50-over: Shell Cricket Academy Invitation XI v Sri Lankans

First-class: West Indies Cricket Board President's XI v Sri Lankans

ODI series

1st ODI

2nd ODI

3rd ODI

Test series

1st Test

2nd Test

References

2003
Sri Lanka 2003
International cricket competitions in 2003
2003 in West Indian cricket
2003 in Sri Lankan cricket